Cottageville is an unincorporated community located within South Brunswick Township in Middlesex County, New Jersey, United States. The settlement is located along Davidson Mill Road (formerly named Cottageville Road) at the former Newark–Trenton Fast Line right-of-way, now a PSE&G transmission line corridor. The trolley stop at the settlement allowed for summer cottages to be built in the area leading to the area's name. Today, some of the older homes remain in addition to a summer camp, forest land, and PSE&G's Deans substation.

References

South Brunswick, New Jersey
Unincorporated communities in Middlesex County, New Jersey
Unincorporated communities in New Jersey